Animal Joy is the seventh studio album by the Austin, Texas, band Shearwater. It was released on February 28, 2012, under the Sub Pop label.

Track listing
All songs written by Jonathan Meiburg

External links
Sub Pop
Shearwater on Sub Pop
Official Shearwater site

References

2012 albums
Shearwater (band) albums
Sub Pop albums